Catya Plate is a Brooklyn-based filmmaker and multidisciplinary artist. She is best known for her stop-motion animated short-films The Reading, Hanging by a Thread and Meeting MacGuffin.

Life and career
Plate was born in Barcelona, Spain and grew up in Cologne, Germany. She attended to Schiller Gymnasium, Koeln, Germany before earning her fine arts degree at the Kölner Werkschulen and relocated to New York in 1987 through a Fulbright Scholarship for post-graduate Fine Arts studies at the School of Visual Arts. In 1997, she received an Artist in the Marketplace award from the Bronx Museum of the Arts and in 2008 her work was selected for permanent inclusion in the Art Base of the Elizabeth A. Sackler Center for Feminist Art at the Brooklyn Museum.

Plate's debut stop-motion animated short film The Reading, won Best Animated Film at the Seattle True Independent Film Festival. Her second stop-motion animated short film Hanging By A Thread, premiered at Nevada City Film Festival, where it won the Best Animated Short. It also won Spirit Award for Animation at the Brooklyn Film Festival. In 2017, the second short in the trilogy, Meeting MacGuffin, the sequel of Hanging By A Thread, screened at the Academy Awards qualifying Holly Shorts in 2017, won Grand Prize for Best Animated Short at the  Academy Awards qualifying Rhode Island International Film Festival, Shorts Production Design Award at the Other Worlds Austin Festival, Merit Award at the Indie Fest, Best Animated Film at the Seattle True Independent Film Festival and Jury Citation Award for Best Animation at the Black Maria Film Festival.

Selected exhibitions
 2018 Solo - Meeting MacGuffin, Torrance Art Museum 
 2015 Group - The Drawing Center, OPEN SESSIONS GROUP 5
 2014 Solo - A New Brave New World, Indianapolis Art Center
 2010 Solo - Clothespin Tarot, Center for Book Arts
 2009 Solo - Tiny Messengers, Ў Gallery
 2003 Solo - Close Up, Galerie Elten & Elten
 2003 Solo - Extra Sensory Perception, Robert V. Fullerton Art Museum

Filmography

References

External links

 

American animators
American women film directors
American women film producers
American animated film directors
American animated film producers
Year of birth missing (living people)
Living people
Stop motion animators
American women animators
21st-century American women